A modular software music studio consists of a plugin architecture that allows the audio to be routed from one plugin to another in many ways, similar to how cables carry an audio signal between physical pieces of hardware.

All aspects of signal synthesis and manipulation are handled entirely by the plugin system. Signal synthesis is performed by "Generators" such as synthesizers, noise generator functions, samplers, and trackers. The signal can then be manipulated further by "Effects" such as distortions, filters, delays, and mastering plugins.

List of software with modular capabilities

Free audio software
 SpiralSynthModular
 Pure Data
 jMax
 SynFactory
 aRts
 Jeskola Buzz
 Psycle is a tracker combined with modular capabilities
 SuperCollider is a platform for audio synthesis and algorithmic composition
 Buzztrax
 Aldrin
 Carla
 VCV Rack
FAUST

Other audio software
Audulus
Reaktor
AudioMulch
Max/Msp
Bidule
Reason
SynthEdit
SynthMaker
SunVox
AudioGL
Bespoke
Integra Live
Modulince
Jasuto
Trilobite
VSTforX
Metaplugin
Audulus
MUX Modular
CPS
Cabbage Studio
Praxis Live

Music software plugin architectures

See also 

 LV2